Penrod's Double Trouble is a 1938 American comedy film directed by Lewis Seiler, written by Crane Wilbur, and based on stories by Booth Tarkington. The film stars Billy Mauch, Bobby Mauch, Dick Purcell, Gene Lockhart, Kathleen Lockhart and Hugh O'Connell. The film was released by Warner Bros. on July 23, 1938.

Plot

Cast 
 Billy Mauch as Penrod Schofield
 Bobby Mauch as Danny Dugan 
 Dick Purcell as Tex Boyden
 Gene Lockhart as Mr. Frank Schofield
 Kathleen Lockhart as Mrs. Laura Schofield
 Hugh O'Connell as Professor Caligostro
 Charles Halton as Mr. Bitts
 Bernice Pilot as Delia
 Jackie Morrow as Rodney Bitts
 Philip Hurlic as Verman
 Lillian Yarbo as Mrs. Washington (uncredited)

References

External links 
 
 
 
 

1938 films
Warner Bros. films
American comedy films
1938 comedy films
Films directed by Lewis Seiler
American black-and-white films
Films based on works by Booth Tarkington
1930s English-language films
1930s American films